National Trade Union Confederation may refer to:

 National Trade Union Confederation (Romania)
 National Trade Union Confederation – Meridian, Romania
 National Trade Union Confederation of Moldova
 National Trade Unions Confederation, Mauritius
 National Trade Union Confederation (Cambodia)

See also
 National trade union center
 List of federations of trade unions